Black Tape is the second full-length album from The Explosion. It was released in the United States on October 15, 2004, on Virgin Records. The band released a music video for the lead single "Here I Am" and "No Revolution".

"No Revolution" was featured in the video games NFL Street 2 and Midnight Club 3: Dub Edition. "Here I Am" was in the soundtracks for Burnout 3: Takedown and Tony Hawk's Underground 2, while an instrumental was included in Cars.

Track listing 
"Deliver Us" – 1:42
"Filthy Insane" – 3:08
"Here I Am" – 2:47
"I Know" – 3:34
"We All Fall Down" – 2:57
"Mothers Cry" – 3:14
"Atrocity" – 3:20
"Go Blank" – 3:21
"No Revolution" – 2:46
"Heavyweight" – 3:24
"Grace" – 3:40
"Hollywood Sign" – 3:06

Japanese bonus tracks
"Black Tuesday"
"Jeffrey Lee"

Personnel

2004 albums
The Explosion albums